Hellinsia distinctus is a moth of the family Pterophoridae that is found from Europe to India, Korea, Japan, China and Russia. Within Europe, it is found from Germany and the Benelux east to Poland, Slovakia, Hungary and Romania, from Italy north to Fennoscandia, and in Greece, Estonia, Latvia and northern and central Russia.

The larvae feed on Antennaria dioica, Gnaphalium luteoalbum, Omalotheca sylvatica, Artemisia absinthium and Artemisia chamaemelifolia.

References

External links
 Taxonomic And Biological Studies Of Pterophoridae Of Japan (Lepidoptera)
 Japanese Moths
Swedish Lepidoptera

distinctus
Moths described in 1855
Plume moths of Asia
Plume moths of Europe
Taxa named by Gottlieb August Wilhelm Herrich-Schäffer